Pierre Honoré Kazadi Lukonda Ngube-Ngube (born 28 July 1963, Lubumbashi, Katanga Province) is a Congolese economist and politician who is a former member of the Parliament of the Democratic Republic of the Congo. Previously he had been an economics professor at the universities of Kasaï and Katanga, and is also a Protestant chaplain. He was a presidential candidate for the Popular Front for Justice party (FPJ) in the 2018 Democratic Republic of the Congo general election.

References

 

1963 births
People from Lubumbashi
Living people
Candidates for President of the Democratic Republic of the Congo
Democratic Republic of the Congo Protestants
Democratic Republic of the Congo politicians
Democratic Republic of the Congo economists